Archie Albert Barwick (7 March 1890 – 28 January 1966) was an Australian farmer and soldier known for his diaries of World War I.   His set of diaries are recognised as one of the most extensive and well written first hand accounts of military service in World War I.

Early life
Barwick was born at Colebrook, Monmouth County (now known as Southern Midlands Council), Tasmania on 7 March 1890, to George Arthur Sturgeon Barwick and Elizabeth Ann Barwick.  He worked from an early age on the family's farm near Hobart, Tasmania.  He received an education and was raised in the Anglican Christian faith.  As a young man he obtained a farm managers position on Alex Mitchell's Surveyors Creek property near Woolbrook, high in the New England district of New South Wales, raising sheep.

World War I
Archie Barwick enlisted in World War I at 24 years of age at Randwick, New South Wales on the 24 August 1914, in what was expected to be a great adventure, just 3 weeks after the British Empire declared war on the German Empire.  He served mostly in the 1st Battalion (aka Sydney Regiment) in C Company. He was enthusiastic about enlisting, recording in his diary that he "threw 2 or 3 somersaults" in celebration.  He was measured by the Army at 5’ 4” height and 152lbs weight, with ruddy complexion, fair hair and blue eyes.  He was equipped for the infantry at Randwick Racecourse Camp, and underwent basic training at Kensington Racecourse Camp (now UNSW) for 7 weeks.  Barwick embarked in the First Australian Imperial Force (AIF) sailing on the steamship HMAT A19 'Afric' on 18 October 1914 and stopped at Albany, Western Australia, from 25-31 Oct 1914 for a gathering of military ships.  The First ANZAC Convoy was then formed, comprising 38 transport ships, full of adventurers off to war, and escorted by 4 warships.  Tragically for most of the men on board, they left Australia for the very last time on 1 Nov 1914.  They sailed north across the Indian Ocean and were warned about the presence of enemy warships on 8 Nov 1914, and then the ships were blacked out at night.  As the convoy passed the Cocos Islands the next day, the escort cruiser HMAS ‘Sydney’ detached. It fought a battle with the German cruiser ‘Emden’ and destroyed it on 9 Nov (memorial gun in Hyde Park, Sydney).  The convoy stopped at Colombo, British Ceylon (now Sri Lanka), from 15-16 Nov for supplies, and the battle scarred ‘Sydney’ rejoined them.  The convoy continued to Suez, Egypt, Africa and stopped from 1-2 Dec 1914 for military instructions, and then sailed north through the Suez Canal on 3 Dec and reached Alexandria, Egypt on 5 Dec.  Barwick and the 1st Battalion disembarked into the exotic and historical land of Egypt on 9 December 1914. They went by train south to its capital city of Cairo and set up Mena Camp beneath the famous Pyramids.  Barwick, like many soldiers, climbed the Pyramid of Khafre and the Pyramid of Khufu, and considered the limestone capped Khafre to be the more difficult.  He celebrated Christmas away from family and home, and in the winter there.  They underwent military training for 3 months including musketry and attack tactics and co-ordinating with other units.  During regular periods of leave they would usually go into Cairo, and explore the maze of souks (aka markets) and have wild parties in the cafes and bars.  He was joined in C Company of 1st Battalion by his young brother Len Barwick on 3 Apr 1915, as they were leaving Mena Camp.  They were fortunate in having each of others friendship, support and care, to help survive the hard, desperate and violent war years.

Barwick was sent to war and fought with British Forces against Turk Forces in the bloodbath of the Gallipoli Campaign in European Turkey of Apr 1915 to Jan 1916, where the British aimed to capture the Turk capital of Constantinople (now Istanbul).  It resulted in a British defeat and loss of 250K British and 300K Turk casualties.  They were shipped on HMT 'Minniwaaka' from Alexandria on 4 Apr 1915, and sailed north across the Mediterranean Sea, and stopped at Mudros, Lemnos Island, Greece from 8-24 Apr, for a gathering of an invasion armada.  They would leave the ship for periods of training including amphibious landings on Lemnos. The 1st Battalion, attached to the Australian 1st Brigade, attached to the Australian 1st Division, all sailed on the night of 24 Apr to the combat zone off Gallipoli.  They watched and were deafened in shock and awe, as the accompanying British Royal Navy battleships launched a preparatory bombardment down on Turk positions on Gallipoli.  On the journey there, the soldiers were paid with Turkish currency, which Barwick said in his diary showed the confidence of success of the British. He fought in the Battle of the Landing at ANZAC on 25-26 Apr 1915, where the British launched an amphibious assault and established a foothold on the rugged peninsula of Gallipoli (now ANZAC Day) and also in the Battle of the Defence of ANZAC on 19–21 May 1915.  He fought in the Battle of Sari Bair on 6-10 Aug 1915 including the Battle of Lone Pine.  There his 1st Battalion comrades Len Keysor was awarded the Victoria Cross for quickly throwing back unexploded Turk bombs on the 7 and 8 Aug, and Alfred Shout was awarded the Victoria Cross for charging down lost trenches throwing bombs at Turks on the 9 Aug.  Barwick fought in the Action of Hill 60, Suvla on 21-27 Aug 1915 and remarkably survived 8 months of conflict.  He was in the second last group to leave Gallipoli, during the successful Evacuation of ANZAC on 19-20 Dec 1915.  Barwick said it was "one of the most glorious and at the same time disastrous campaigns as Great Britain ever had anything to do with".

Barwick returned to Alexandria on 28 Dec 1915 and fell sick with septic sores and was separated from his brother Len.  He slowly recovered over 6 weeks in Cairo and then joined the Egyptian Campaign.  He went to the combat zone of the Suez Canal and rejoined his brother Len in the 1st Battalion at Serapeum on 6 Mar 1916, as they guarded the east bank of the canal in the Sinai Desert.   Most of the AIF were transferred as reinforcements to the disastrous Western Front Theatre in France, Europe.  The 1st Battalion embarked from Alexandria on 22 Mar 1916 and sailed west across the Mediterranean Sea and landed at Marseilles, France on 28 Mar 1916 and went by train north for 1,000 km to the combat zone of Flanders.  Barwick returned to the nightmare of trench warfare, fighting in the Flanders Trenches Campaign.  He was separated from his brother again, when Len contracted an illness on 22 Jun 1916 and slowly recovered in France.  Archie Barwick fought on with French Forces and British Forces against German Forces in the fearful Somme Offensive in Picardy, including in the Battle of Pozières on 23 Jul-3 Sep 1916, where he was promoted in the field to Corporal on 1 Aug 1916.  His company was involved in the capture of the town of Pozières under a "fearful bombardment" of German shells.  He was promoted to Sergeant on 26 Oct 1916 and rejoined by his brother Len in the Battle of Flers–Courcelette on 4-19 Nov 1916, where Archie Barwick was wounded in action on 5 Nov, but continued to soldier on.   The next year he was separated from his brother again, when Len transferred to the ANZAC Workshops in France on 2 Feb 1917.   Archie Barwick fought in an engagement near Demicourt, Artois, in the Hindenburg Line Campaign, and was wounded in action again, with a gunshot through his right shoulder on 8 Apr 1917.  He was admitted to the 6th General Hospital in Rouen, Normandy  and made a quick recovery and rejoined the 1st Battalion on 22 Apr 1917, as it was fighting up to the Hindenburg Line.  He fought in the Battle of Bullecourt II from 3–17 May 1917, where his 1st Battalion comrade George Howell was awarded the Victoria Cross for running along a parapet of a lost trench throwing bombs down on Germans on the 6 May 1917.  After nearly a year of conflict, he was luckily transferred away from the battle on 6 May 1917.

Barwick obtained a position as an Instructor for the Australian 1st Training Battalion at Durrington Camp near Salisbury, Wiltshire, England.   He undertook training at Tidworth for 6 weeks and then worked for 3 months.   However he was returned the War and shipped from Southampton over to Le Havre, France, on the night of 25 Sep 1917. He fought with British Forces against German Forces in the blood and mud of the Ypres 1917 Campaign in Belgium and rejoined the 1st Battalion there on 2 Oct 1917.  They were preparing to go into action and he fought in the Battle of Broodseinde on 4 Oct 1917, and in the Battle of Poelcappelle on 9 Oct 1917 and in the Battle of Passchendaele II on 26 Oct-10 Nov 1917.  Later the King of Belgium recognised his 'conspicuous services rendered'.  The next year Barwick fought with French Forces and British Forces against German Forces in the desperate German Offensive Campaign, including in the Battle of the Lys, Flanders from 9-29 Apr 1918.  After a further 6 months conflict, he was wounded in action for a third occasion, when an exploding shell in the battle caused severe chest injuries on 15 Apr 1918.  He was admitted to hospital in Etaples, but his condition was serious and he was transferred to Queens Civil Hospital Birmingham, Warwickshire, England on 20 Apr 1918 for 9 weeks treatment.   He was discharged to leave in London but unfortunately caught the Spanish Flu and was admitted to Harefield Hospital, Wiltshire on 26 Jun 1918 for 3 weeks treatment.  He recovered and was transferred to the Australian No.1 Convalescent Unit at Sutton Veny, Wiltshire on 18 Jul 1918.   After 6 months treatment and rehabilitation he obtained Special Leave for 1914 soldiers and went to St Budeux Barracks, Devenport on 16 Oct 1918.  He shipped out of England on 3 Dec 1918 and returned to Australia, landing at Melbourne on 27 Jan 1919.  Barwick was discharged from the AIF as a Sergeant after 5 years service at Hobart on 30 Mar 1919.

His two brothers Leonard George Barwick (known as Len & b 1894) and Norman Stanley Barwick (known as Stan & 1891-1917) also served in World War I. Len enlisted at Liverpool, New South Wales on 26 October 1914 and served mostly in the 1st Battalion, alongside Archie. He obtained Special Leave for 1914 soldiers and returned to Australia, landing at Melbourne on 2 Dec 1918. Stan enlisted at Clermont, Tasmania on 8 July 1916 and served mostly in the 12th Battalion. After training in England, Stan was sent to war and went to the 1st Australian Division Base Depot at Etaples, France on 11 Apr 1917, where he was reunited with his brother Archie recovering from his second wound, from 16–21 April 1917. Stan was killed in action near Remus Wood, Belgium on 8 October 1917. He was commemorated with 54,000 men whose graves are not known at Menin Gate Memorial, Ypres, Belgium.

Honours
Barwick was awarded the Belgian Croix de Guerre on 19 January 1918, receiving notification on 5 February 1918. His award was published in the London Gazette on 12 Jul 1918, and in the Commonwealth of Australia Gazette on 27 Nov 1918. He was presented with his medal in England on 13 September 1918.

Barwick was one of the six Australians whose war experiences were presented in The War That Changed Us, a four-part television documentary series about Australia's involvement in World War I. He has also featured in projects such as AnzacLive and Anzac360.ac360.

Diary
Barwick wrote 16 diaries documenting his war service, approximately 400,000 words in total. He tried to keep a daily record of his experiences, however he was sometimes forced to write entries later or from notes. His diaries are noted for their detailed description of his experiences and for their style, which has been described as similar to the Boys' Own publications.

Life after World War I

An abridged edition of approximately 133,000 words was published in 2013.

Family life
After his return from the War, a welcome party was held for him at Woolbrook, Walcha Shire, New South Wales on 3 May 1919. He lived for some time in Tasmania before returning to New England.

Archie Barwick married Mona Carroll in 1930. The couple had three children, John, Judy and Tim, and lived on the property Rooya, Abington Creek near Armidale, New South Wales. He was a justice of the peace.

When invasion by Japan was feared in World War II, Barwick was placed in charge of the local Volunteer Defence Corps.

Archie Barwick died on 28 January 1966 at Uralla, New South Wales.

Works

See also
Anzac Day
List of Australian diarists of World War I

References

Further reading

External links
Barwick diaries, 22 August 1914 – 26 January 1919, linking to full-text scan of each diary (digitised)

Archie Barwick | National Anzac Centre

Australian military personnel of World War I
Australian Army soldiers
Volunteer Defence Corps officers
Recipients of the Croix de guerre (Belgium)
Australian diarists
People from Armidale
1890 births
1966 deaths
Date of death missing
20th-century diarists